1946 in philosophy

Events

Publications 
 Michael Polanyi, Science, Faith and Society (1946)
 Erich Auerbach, Mimesis: The Representation of Reality in Western Literature (1946)

Births 
 April 22 - Paul Davies
 July 3 - Jean-Luc Marion 
 July 6 - Peter Singer 
 August 11 - Marilyn vos Savant 
 September 7 - Francisco Varela (died 2001)
 December 10 - Raymond Geuss

Deaths

References 

Philosophy
20th-century philosophy
Philosophy by year